Swingtime in the Movies is a 1938 American short comedy–musical film directed and written by Crane Wilbur. In 1939, it was nominated for an Academy Award for Best Live Action Short Film, Two-Reel at the 11th Academy Awards. Swingtime in the Movies is included on the DVD of the 1940 Raoul Walsh film They Drive By Night.

Cast
 Fritz Feld as Mr. Nitvitch
 Kathryn Kane as Joan Mason (as Katherine Kane)
 John Carroll as Rick Arden
 Charley Foy as Sammy
 Jerry Colonna as The Texas Tornado
 Helen Lynd as Lorna, an Actress
 Irene Franklin as Kate, Head Waitress  
 
Featuring:
 George Brent as himself (uncredited)
 Marie Wilson as herself (uncredited) 
 Pat O'Brien as himself (uncredited)
 The Dead End Kids (Huntz Hall, Leo Gorcey, Billy Halop, and Bobby Jordan) as 'Crime School Kids' (uncredited)
 Humphrey Bogart as himself (uncredited)
 John Garfield as himself (uncredited)
 Lane Sisters as Themselves (uncredited)

References

External links

1938 films
1938 musical comedy films
1938 short films
American musical comedy films
American black-and-white films
American comedy short films
Films directed by Crane Wilbur
Vitaphone short films
Warner Bros. short films
1930s English-language films
1930s American films